Leora "Sam" Jones (born August 11, 1960) is an American former handball player who competed 3 times in the Olympics: 1984 Summer Olympics, 1988, and 1992.

Jones first was a basketball player at East Carolina University, averaging 16 points/game during her career for the Pirates. She then became an assistant coach for East Carolina when she was invited to US team handball tryouts. Between the 1984 and 1988 Olympics Jones played in Europe, with Hypobank in Austria in 1985 and with Bayer Leverkusen in Germany, helping them win the German Championship in 1986. Jones also competed at the Pan American Games in 1987, winning a gold medal. During her career Jones was voted US Team Handball Federation Player of the Year three times. She later worked in Raleigh, North Carolina for United Parcel Services (UPS).

References

1960 births
Living people
People from Mount Olive, North Carolina
American female handball players
Olympic handball players of the United States
Handball players at the 1984 Summer Olympics
Handball players at the 1988 Summer Olympics
Handball players at the 1992 Summer Olympics
21st-century American women